The Hideaways were a pop group that flourished in the mid-1960s as part of the Merseybeat era, and played at The Cavern Club over 250 times, more frequently than The Beatles; they are also noted for their connection to the Timex Watches advertising campaign of the time. The band included Ozzie Yue, later to become a well-known actor and Frankie Connor, now a BBC Radio Merseyside DJ. Judd Lander (harmonica / vocals) later to become a well-known London session musician, who performed on Spice Girls and Culture Club's worldwide No. 1 hits, along with performances on Paul McCartney, Annie Lennox, Beach Boys, and a host of other major artists albums, Lander became a director at various major record labels working closely with artists such as Michael Jackson, ABBA, The Ramones, Run DMC, Salt & Pepper, and instrumental in the breaking of Meat Loaf's multi-platinum album Bat Out Of Hell - now heads his own PR agency Lander PR Ltd. As a group, The Hideaways now hold the official world record for over 300 Cavern performances in both old and new venues, and still perform annually at the Cavern Club.

Career
The band formed in about October 1963 by Ozzie Yue (guitar, vocals), John Shell (bass guitar) and John Donaldson (drums); Frankie Connor joined three months later, followed by Judd Lander on harmonica.

In 1969, under the name of 'Confucius', they released their only single "The Brandenburg Concerto".

Shell, American by birth, died in the Vietnam War aged twenty. Lander later played with Paul McCartney's Wings, provide harmonica for Culture Club's number 1 hit "Karma Chameleon" and become head of music for Warner Brothers UK.

References

External links

Musical groups established in 1963
1963 establishments in the United Kingdom
Beat groups